{{Infobox food
| name             = Aush reshteh
| image            = Ash Reshteh.JPG
| image_size       = 250px
| caption          = Iranian thick soup, aush reshteh, mainly consisting of herbs, beans, and noodles
| alternate_name   = , aush reshteh, aush-e-reshteh, aashe reshteh, ash e-reshteh, āsh e reshteh, aash-e-reshteh-e
| country         = 
| region           = 
| creator          = 
| course           = First or main (optional)
| type             = Thick soup
| served           = 
| main_ingredient  = Herbs, beans, lentil, water, noodles and turmeric
| variations       = Pinto Beans can be replaced with kidney beans
| calories         = 
| other            = A vegan dish if served without kashk
}}Aush reshteh or aush-e-reshteh is a type of aush'' (Iranian thick soup) featuring reshteh (thin noodles) and kashk (a dairy product, made from cooked or dried yogurt), commonly made in Iran.

About 
There are more than 50 types of thick soup (aush) in Iranian cooking, this being one of the more popular types. The ingredients used are reshteh (thin noodles), kashk (a whey-like, fermented dairy product), herbs such as parsley, spinach, dill, spring onion ends and sometimes coriander, chick peas, black eye beans, lentils, onions, flour, dried mint, garlic, oil, salt and pepper. This is a soup that is vegetarian but can easily be made vegan by omitting the kashk; alternatively, meat can be added.

History 
Aush reshteh is an ancient soup that changed in recipe over time and by A.D. 500 the noodles were introduced to the dish, making it more closely related to the present day recipe. 

It is cooked most in autumn and winter. Traditionally, aush reshteh is served at special Iranian events, like Nowruz, Sizdah be-dar, or during winter time. The noodles are supposed to symbolize good fortune for the new year.

See also
Aush
Aush-e-anar
List of soups

References

Iranian soups
Azerbaijani soups
Turkish soups
Vegetarian dishes of Iran